Banbhore, Bambhore, Bhanbhore or Bhambhore is a city dating to the 1st century BCE located in modern-day Sindh, Pakistan. The city ruins lie on the N-5 National Highway, east of Karachi. It dates back to the Scytho-Parthian era and was later controlled by Muslims from the 8th to the 13th century, after which it was abandoned. Remains of one of the earliest known mosques in the region dating back to 727 AD are still preserved in the city. In 2004, Department of Archaeology and Museums Pakistan submitted the site for UNESCO World Heritage Sites.

Legacy and importance in Sindh 
On 23 April 2014, Sindh government announced to make a new division (consisting of Thatta, Badin and Sujawal) with the name Bhanbhore Division to highlight historical importance of the site.

Location

The city ruins are located on the N-5 National Highway between Dhabeji and Gharo.

History

The city of Bhanbhore dates from the 1st century BC to the 13th century AD. Archaeological records reveal remnants of three distinct periods on the site: Scytho-Parthian (1st century BC to 2nd century AD), Buddhist (2nd century AD to 8th century AD), and early Islamic (8th century AD to 13th century AD). The city was gradually deserted after the 13th century due to change in the course of the Indus.

Some archaeologist and historians suggest that Bhanbhore is the historical city of Debal, which the Arab general Muhammad bin Qasim conquered in 711–712 after defeating Raja Dahir, the last Hindu ruler of Sindh. However, this identification has not yet been confirmed, though numerous research and excavation works have been carried out to link the two cities. Preliminary excavations in the area were first done by Ramesh Chandra Majumdar in 1928 and later by Leslie Alcock in 1951. Pakistani archaeologist Dr F.A. Khan conducted extensive studies and excavations in the site from 1958 to 1965. In March 2012, the Culture Department of Government of Sindh organised the first International Conference on Bhanbhore, where different experts and archaeologists presented their research on the site.

Bhanbhore may also have been known as Barbari or Barbaricon (Βαρβαρικόν) to the Greeks and through the centuries, but it has not yet been proven that these historical cities are the same.

Ruins

Archaeological findings show that the city consisted of an enclosed area surrounded by a stone and mud wall. The citadel was divided into eastern and western sections by a fortified stone wall in the center. The eastern part contains ruins of a mosque with an inscription dating to 727 AD, sixteen years after the conquest of Sindh, indicating the best-preserved example of the earliest mosques in the region. The remains of the mosque were discovered in 1960. Remains of houses, streets, and other buildings have been found both within and outside the citadel. Contemporary stone buildings from the three periods are also uncovered in the area including a palatial stone building with semi-circular shape, a Shiva temple from the Hindu period, and a mosque. Three gateways to the citadel were also uncovered during excavations.

Bhanbhore Port
Bhanbhore was a medieval port city deriving its wealth from imported ceramic and metal goods, an industrial sector, and trade. The city was strategically located at the mouth of the Indus, linking it with rest of the Indo-Scythians and Indo-Parthians and international traders in the Indian Ocean. Archaeological findings show a half-submerged anchorage structure with solid stone foundation, which may have been used for berthing cargo boats. However, the port was abandoned when the Indus river shifted its position and the creek was silted.

World Heritage Site
The Port of Bhanbhore was submitted for induction in World Heritage Sites by the Department of Archaeology and Museums of Pakistan in January 2004. It is currently in the tentative list under the criteria iv, v, and vi of the cultural category.

Gallery

See also
Archaeological Museum Banbhore
List of UNESCO World Heritage Sites in Pakistan
Barbarikon
Debal

References

Further reading
 F. A. Khan, Banbhore; a preliminary report on the recent archaeological excavations at Banbhore, Dept. of Archaeology and Museums, Govt. of Pakistan, 1963.

External links 

 Sama Faruqi, Resolving the mystery of an ancient site in Sindh Dawn (Herald magazine), Published 23 September 2016.

World Heritage Sites in Sindh
Archaeological sites in Sindh
Tourist attractions in Sindh
Thatta District